The 10th ACTRA Awards were presented on April 3, 1981, and hosted by Gordon Pinsent.

Television

Radio

Journalism and special awards

References

1981 in Canadian television
ACTRA
ACTRA Awards